Tim Barker may refer to:

 Tim Barker (rugby union) (born 1981), Irish rugby union footballer
 Tim Barker (priest) (born 1956), Anglican priest